Centennial Secondary School can refer to:
Brampton Centennial Secondary School, in Brampton, Ontario
Centennial Secondary School (Coquitlam), in Coquitlam, British Columbia
Centennial Secondary School (Belleville, Ontario), in Belleville, Ontario
Centennial Secondary School (Windsor, Ontario), in Windsor, Ontario, closed 1985
Welland Centennial Secondary School, in Welland, Ontario